Barbasetti is an Italian surname. Notable people with the surname include:

Curio Barbasetti di Prun (1885–1953), Italian military officer
Luigi Barbasetti (1859–1948), Italian fencer

Italian-language surnames